Baradi is a rāga belonging to the tradition of Odissi music.

Baradi may also refer to:

Places

India
Baradi, Goa, village subdivision in Goa, India
Bara Dih, village in Uttar Pradesh, India
Baradi (village), village in Maharashtra, India
Baradiya, village in Gujarat, India

Australia
Baradine, town in New South Wales, Australia
Baradine County, one of the Cadastral divisions of New South Wales, Australia

Other
Baradili, municipality in the Province of Oristano, Italy

Unions
Baradi Union, smallest administrative body of Bangladesh 
Baradi Union, Alamdanga,  union parishad in Alamdanga Upazila, Bangladesh

Railway station
Baradighi railway station, railway station in West Bengal, India